Carpia was an Iberian city which is said to be the site of the ancient city Tartessos, which disappeared around 600 BCE, or the refoundation of the sunken city.

History 
Pausanias, a Greek traveler and geographer of the 2nd century CE, wrote of a connection between Tartessos and Carpia after visiting Elis:
"They say that Tartessus is a river in the land of the Iberians, running down into the sea by two mouths, and that between these two mouths lies a city of the same name. The river, which is the largest in Iberia, and tidal, those of a later day called Baetis, and there are some who think that Tartessus was the ancient name of Carpia, a city of the Iberians."

See also
Arganthonios
Tartessian language
Spanish mythology

References

Submerged places
Underwater ruins
Former populated places in Spain
Tartessos